Barbara McMartin (November 18, 1931 – September 27, 2005) was an American mathematician who became an environmentalist and author of 25 books on the Adirondack Mountains.

Life
Barbara McMartin was born November 18, 1931 in Boston, Massachusetts. Her father was physician D. Malcolm McMartin, and mother was Barbara (Clark) McMartin. She grew up with her family in Johnstown, New York, where her father had his practice. She was valedictorian of the Class of 1949 of Johnstown High School.
McMartin married young and had three children. She returned to college later, graduating from Vassar College, cum laude in Mathematics in 1964. She earned a master's degree from Hunter College, and in 1972 she received a PhD in mathematics from the Graduate Division of City University of New York. Her dissertation was One Relator Metabelian Groups under advisors Gilbert Baumslag, Wilhelm Magnus, and Joan Landman Dyer.

In 1972, McMartin turned from mathematics and became involved in the environmental movement in the Adirondacks of New York State, where her primary focus was the nature, culture, and management in the Park. She served as vice-president the Adirondack Mountain Club and the Association for the Protection of the Adirondacks and was a member of many environmental groups.

Between 1972 and 2005, she wrote 25 books, both guide books and histories of the Adirondacks. She wrote and maintained the popular eleven book Discover series, which covers all regions of the Adirondack Park for outdoors people. Her other guides include: The Adirondack Park, A Wildlands Quilt; Fifty Hikes in the Adirondacks; Fifty Hikes in the Hudson Valley; and three books for young people, on hiking, camping, and canoeing.

In 1976, McMartin completed Caroga, an Adirondack Town Recalls its Past. Her other histories include: Hides, Hemlocks and Adirondack History, The Great Forest of the Adirondacks, To the Lake of the Skies (story of the Benedicts), The Glove Cities, Perspectives on the Adirondacks, The Privately Owned Adirondacks and Adirondack Timeline. She also wrote a series of pamphlets and Citizen's Guides for the Adirondack Park Agency.

McMartin served on New York State Department of Environmental Conservation advisory committees: the High Peaks Advisory Committee from 1974 to 1978, and the Forest Preserve Advisory Committee from 1979 to 2003. She chaired the Forest Preserve Advisory Committee from 1979 to 2003 where she helped write many policies.

She served as volunteer curator at the Caroga Historical Museum and at the Fulton County Museum. She had photograph exhibits of her work and published many magazine articles. In 1992 she chaired the NYS Adirondack Park Centennial.

She received a Founder's Day Award from the Adirondack Museum in Blue Mountain Lake, as well as both the Adirondack Communicator and Adirondack Heritage Awards from the Adirondack Council.

Marriages
McMartin's first husband was Edward B Long III.  They had three children, James Long, Nancy Long, and Margaret (Long) Lawrence.  Her four grandchildren are Alicia Loomis, Catherine Loomis, Elizabeth Lawrence, and Daniel Lawrence.

In 1968, McMartin married her second husband, James Joseph Patterson, publisher of The New York Daily News. They divorced in 1976. He predeceased her in 1992.

She married again, to Walter Alexander Reid in 1982. He brought two daughters to the marriage. 

McMartin died on September 27, 2005 in Canada Lake, New York and was survived by her husband, children, and grandchildren.

Selected books

References

1931 births
2005 deaths
American environmentalists
American women environmentalists
American non-fiction environmental writers
Adirondacks
Writers from New York (state)
Hunter College alumni
Vassar College alumni
20th-century American mathematicians
American women mathematicians
20th-century American women scientists
20th-century women mathematicians
21st-century American women